Markowce  (Markivtsi) is a village now in Tysmenytsia Raion in Ivano-Frankivsk Oblast of western Ukraine that was in the administrative district of Gmina Sanok, within Sanok County, Subcarpathian Voivodeship, in south-eastern Poland.

The village has a population of 510.

References

Markowce